Iona Gaels basketball may refer to either of the basketball teams that represent Iona College:

Iona Gaels men's basketball
Iona Gaels women's basketball